The M41, known informally and more commonly as the Pamir Highway, is a road traversing the Pamir Mountains through Afghanistan, Uzbekistan, Tajikistan and Kyrgyzstan with a length of over 1,200 km. It is the only continuous route through the difficult terrain of the mountains and is the main supply route to Tajikistan's Gorno-Badakhshan Autonomous Region. The route has been in use for millennia, as there are a limited number of viable routes through the high Pamir Mountains. The road formed one link of the ancient Silk Road trade route. M41 is the Soviet road number, but it only remains as an official designation in post-Soviet Uzbekistan, as confirmed by official decree. Kyrgyzstan and Tajikistan  have passed decrees abolishing Soviet numbering of highways and assigning their own national numbering.

Route description
Sources disagree on the termini of the highway, with Mazari Sharif, Afghanistan; Termiz, Uzbekistan; Dushanbe, Tajikistan; and Khorog, Tajikistan all being offered as the beginning of the highway. All sources, however, agree that the highway ends in Osh, Kyrgyzstan. The route passes northward through Termiz before turning east and crossing into Tajikistan. It then follows a general eastward route through Dushanbe, the capital of Tajikistan, to Khorog, crossing the Kafirnigan, Vakhsh, and Bartang Rivers. From there, it continues east for about 310 kilometers to Murghab, where it crosses the Murghab River. The highway then passes through the 4,655-meter (15,270 ft) high Ak-Baital Pass and past Lake Karakul before crossing into Kyrgyzstan to its terminus in Osh.

The road was constructed partly in the end of 19th century (during The Great Game), and mostly in 1930s by the Soviet Union.

In 2000s Pamir Highway was connected with China and Karakoram Highway.

The Pamir Highway is designated as route M-41 over much of its length in Tajikistan and Kyrgyzstan, and is known as the second highest altitude international highway in the world (4,655 m). The section between Dushanbe and Murghab has the European route number E 008. The section between Sary-Tash and Osh, Kyrgyzstan has the European route number E 007.

Construction and maintenance levels vary substantially along the highway. The roadway is unpaved in some areas, but otherwise paved most of the way. Except for its stretches in Kyrgyzstan and nearing Dushanbe, the road is heavily damaged in most of its length by erosion, earthquakes, landslides, and avalanches.

Sometimes referred to as the "Heroin Highway," much of the ninety tonnes of heroin that are trafficked through Tajikistan each year pass along this route.

Main points on the Pamir highway
If Pamir Highway is followed from Osh, the route of the highway can be written as follows:

Osh city – Taldyk lane (3615 m, pass through the Alay Range) – Gulcha village – Gulcha river valley – Kyrgyzstan lane (3541 m) – Sary-Tash village (Alay valley) – Kyzylart lane (4250 m, pass through the Trans-Alay range, entrance to the territory of Gorno-Badakhshan Autonomous Region, border crossing between Kyrgyzstan and Tajikistan) – Markansu river valley – Uybulak lane (4200 m) – lake Karakul — Ak-Baital Pass lane (4655 m) — Murghab — Naizatash Lane (4314 m) — Alichur valley — Khargush Lane (4091 m) + Tagarkaty Lane (4168 m) — Sulu-Tagarkaty river valley — Koi-Tezek Lane (4251 m) — Gunt river valley — Khorog — Panj river valley — Qal'ai Khumb village — Khaburabot lane (3720 m) — Obihingou river valley — Vakhsh river valley — Dushanbe city.

Currently, the Pamir Highway is part of the M41 highway.

 ЭМ-05 Road: Osh - Taldyk Pass - Sary-Tash
 ЭМ-06 Road: Sary-Tash - Karamyk - Border of Tajikistan 

 РБ07 Road: Border of Kyrgyzstan - Jirgatol - Obi Garm - Vahdat
 РБ04 Road: Vahdat - Dushanbe
 РБ02 Road: Dushanbe - Tursunzoda

 M41 Road: Border of Tajikistan  - Denov - Termez

History

Old Pamir Highway
At the end of the 19th century — the beginning of the 20th century in Central Asia between the British and Russian empires continued a sharp geopolitical rivalry for influence in the region, which received the name "Great Game" in world history. The military department of the Russian Empire, concerned about the activity of the British in the Pamirs, decided to build a strategic military road along which it would be possible to quickly transfer troops from Fergana to the Alay Valley and carry out their effective supply. The construction was planned and carried out in deep secrecy and for a long time the existence of a road through the Alay Range in Russian Turkestan in Europe was not known.

In the summer of 1903, an officer of the Russian army, military geographer Nikolai Korzhenevsky, climbing the Taldyk Pass (Kyrgyzstan) with a height of 3615 meters, discovered a memorial pillar with the names of people who took part in the design and laying of a road along the Hissaro-Alay in the "Russian" of Turkestan. They were Lieutenant Colonel Bronisław Grombczewski, railway engineers Mickiewicz, Burakovsky, Zarakovsky and Podporuchik Irmuth. For a long time, Europeans believed that the first road through the Taldyk Pass was built in 1916 by Austrians captured in the First World War. Korzhenevsky's diary testifies to something else. He believed that in 1893 it was built by Russian sapper units. However, according to other sources, the first road connecting Osh and Gulcha in Kyrgyzstan through the Taldyk Pass was built in 1876 by a Russian detachment under the command of General Alexander Konstantinovich Abramov. Later, this small section of the road (88 versts - 1.1 km) from Fergana to the Alay Valley of Kyrgyzstan was called the "Old Pamir Highway". According to the testimony of Korzhenevsky, in 1910 only a dangerous pack trail went further from Gulchi to the south, through the Eastern Pamirs. Along the Panj, from Darvaz to Rushan in 1915, Russian units, with the help of the local population, also laid a pack trail, cargo was transported by packs on horses and donkeys. Rockfalls, landslides, avalanches, waterfalls, floods often destroyed the trail. By 1930, according to eyewitnesses, this trail was in terrible condition, even packhorses could hardly pass through it, they had to be constantly unloaded in order to transfer them to the ovrings.

With the completion in 1937, in Soviet era, of the construction of a highway connecting the cities of Osh and Khorog, the Old Pamir Highway became an integral part of the large Pamir Highway.

By the decree of the Presidium of the Supreme Soviet of the USSR of March 5, 1941, the tract was named after Stalin.

Popular culture
In the 1985 film Spies Like Us, the decoy GLG-20s played by Chevy Chase and Dan Aykroyd are told to meet their contacts on the "road to Dushanbe," a reference to the M41 highway.

Gallery

References

External links

'Pamir Highway M41 - The road between the Kyzyl Art pass and the Murgab City - photographs
'Pamir Highway M41 - The road between the Koi Tezek pass and the Khorugh (Khorog) City - photographs
'The M41 in Tajikistan - photographs
'The M41 in Kyrgyzstan - photographs

Roads in Tajikistan
Roads in Kyrgyzstan
Roads in Afghanistan
Roads in Uzbekistan
Central Asian highways
Pamir Mountains
Afghanistan–Soviet Union relations